Le Chêne Billault is a hamlet situated in the Indre-et-Loire (37) and Vienne (86) departments in central France. It lies 3.8 km south-west of Richelieu and is surrounded by agricultural land. The hamlet is situated on the border of three communes: Braye-sous-Faye, Nueil-sous-Faye, and Pouant.

References

Geography of Indre-et-Loire
Geography of Vienne